The  Tampa Bay Storm season was the 30th and final season for the franchise in the Arena Football League, and their 26th while in Tampa Bay. The Storm played at Amalie Arena.

Staff

Roster

Schedule

Regular season
The 2017 regular season schedule was released on January 5, 2017.

Playoffs

Standings

References

Tampa Bay Storm
Tampa Bay Storm seasons
Tampa Bay Storm